Toronto was an unincorporated rural community located in Woodside Township, Sangamon County, Illinois.  It was located adjacent to what is now the Toronto Road exit at Mile 90 of the Illinois section of Interstate 55. Today, the Toronto neighborhood of Springfield is roughly defined as the region bordering Lake Springfield south of Interstate 72 and east of Interstate 55.

History
Toronto was originally built in the 1800s as a rural station stop on the Illinois Central line six miles south of Springfield, Illinois, the state capital.  Farmers would bring fresh vegetables and milk to the now-vanished railroad station for transportation into nearby cities.  The whistle stop may have been named after the Canadian city of Toronto.

In the late 1960s, Illinois planners built a new greenfield state university adjacent to the former Toronto.  The university campus, located 1.5 miles northeast of Toronto, is now the University of Illinois at Springfield (UIS).  Almost all of the land area of the former Toronto has since been annexed into Springfield, and the former rural hamlet has become an urban campustown neighborhood.  Toronto Road continues to commemorate the former rural hamlet and current community.

Economy
Despite its formal incorporation into the boundaries of Springfield, the Toronto area maintains a distinct local economy influenced by the UIS campus, including the Capital Area Career Center and Lincoln Land Community College, parks along the lakefront, the campus-area Lake Pointe apartment complex, and the campus-area bars of Mowie's Cue, Pier 55 Lounge, and Crows Mill Pub.

References

Populated places in Sangamon County, Illinois
Springfield metropolitan area, Illinois
Unincorporated communities in Illinois